Toshihiro Egawa (born 1973) is a Japanese artist who created many album covers, merchandise and logo for extreme metal bands. He was born and lives in Osaka, Japan.

List of Works
 7 H.Target - 0.00 Apocalypse
 Abigail Williams - In the Shadow of a Thousand Suns
 Annotations of an Autopsy - Before the Throne of Infection
 Beheaded - Recounts of Disembodiment
 Beheaded - Ominous Bloodline
 By the Patient - Servants
 By the Patient - Premonitions
 Cenotaph - Pseudo Verminal Cadaverium
 Cenotaph - Putrescent Infectious Rabidity
 Cerebral Effusion - Smashed and Splattered Organs
 Cryptopsy - The Best of Us Bleed
 Darkall Slaves - Transcendental State of Absolute Suffering
 Death Reality - Flesh Still Feeds
 Decaying Purity - The Existence of Infinite Agony
 Decimation - Anthems of an Empyreal Dominion
 Deeds of Flesh - Reduced to Ashes
 Defeated Sanity - Chapters of Repugnance
 Defeated Sanity - Collected Demolition
 Defeated Sanity - Passages into Deformity
 Devangelic - Resurrection Denied
 Devourment - Butcher the Weak
 Devourment - Conceived in Sewage
 Disfiguring the Goddess - Sleeper
 Disfiguring the Goddess - Black Earth Child
 Disfiguring the Goddess - Deprive
 Gored - Incinerate the Vanquished
 Grotesque Formation - Basement Decompositions
 Guttural Engorgement - The Slow Decay of Infested Flesh
 Human Rejection - Torture of Decimation
 Hyonblud - Chaos from World Orgasm
 Ichor - Benthic Horizon
 Impure - In Disrespect to Mankind
 Indecent Excision - Aberration
 Infernal Revulsion - An Epic Conviction
 Ingested - Surpassing the Boundaries of Human Suffering
 Ingested - The Architect of Extinction
 Insision - End of All
 Internal Suffering - Unmercyful Extermination
 Internal Suffering - Chaotic Matrix
 Internal Suffering - Choronzonic Force Domination
 Krisiun - The Great Execution
 Lay Down Rotten - Mask of Malice, Deathspell Catharsis
 Leukorrhea - Breeding Salvation
 Lividity - Used, Abused, and Left for Dead
 Malignancy - Cross Species Transmutation
 Massacre - Back from Beyond
 Membro Genitali Befurcator - Human Destruction\
 Mortem - Death Is My Name
 Mortician - Zombie Massacre Live!
 Mucopus - Undimensional
 Pukelization - New Creation, Inorganic Fields
 Purulent Infection - Exhuming the Putrescent
 Pyrexia - Age of the Wicked, Feast of Iniquity
 Rafflesia - In the Face of Suffering
 Rotting - The Forgotten
 Saprogenic - The Wet Sound of Flesh on Concrete
 Suture - Carnivorous Urge to Kill, Morbid Sculpture: Demo(n)ology, Skeletal Vortex, Prolific Inhuman Deformity
 Terminally Your Aborted Ghost - Slowly Peeling the Flesh from the Inside of a Folded Hand
 The Partisan Turbine - The Partisan Turbine
 Through Your Silence - The Zenith Distance
 Trigger the Bloodshed - The Great Depression
 Visceral Disgorge - Ingesting Putridity
 Vomit Remnants - Supreme Vehemence (Discography '05)

References

External links
 

Living people
Albums with cover art by Toshihiro Egawa
Album-cover and concert-poster artists
1973 births
Japanese artists